Mohammad Salamati is an Iranian reformist politician and economist.

Career 
Salamati succeeded Reza Esfahani as the agriculture minister in September 1980 and held office until a cabinet change in 1983. He was an advocate of food self-sufficiency and believed "all other productive sectors of the economy were to be reoriented to meet the demands of the agricultural sector and not vice versa." Salamati adopted a decentralization policy and transferred administration and servicing from Tehran to provinces. In 1989, when he served as a member of the commission on financial and economic affairs in the Iranian Parliament, he criticized positioning Trade-Industrial Free Zones on borders.

References

1946 births
Living people
People from Kashmar
Government ministers of Iran
Mojahedin of the Islamic Revolution of Iran Organization politicians
Secretaries-General of political parties in Iran
Members of the 3rd Islamic Consultative Assembly